Herbert Young may refer to:

Herbert J. Young, athlete
Herbert Young (politician), see List of foreign ministers in 1994

See also
Bert Young (disambiguation)